Helen Jane Ward (née Lander; born 26 April 1986) is an international football striker who is currently playing club football for Watford. Ward previously spent three seasons with Chelsea Ladies, whom she joined from Arsenal in 2010. Born in the London Borough of Brent, Ward began her career with 14 years at Watford Ladies where she was a prolific goal scorer and team captain.

Ward played for the England women's national under-23 football team in 2007, but chose to represent Wales at senior level in 2008. With 44 goals, she is the Welsh national team's all–time record goal scorer.

Club career
Ward began her career with Watford Ladies, joining at the age of nine and progressing to become captain of the senior side. She left to join Arsenal Ladies in January 2009, scoring on her debut later that month as Arsenal beat Colchester United in the FA Women's Cup.

Ward moved to Chelsea Ladies in September 2010.

In December 2013, Ward announced a transfer from Chelsea to Reading. There she was reunited with former Arsenal and Wales teammate Jayne Ludlow, who was Reading's manager. Ward returned to training ahead of the 2015 FA WSL 2 season, after giving birth to daughter Emily in September 2014.

On 8 February 2017, Ward joined newly promoted FA WSL 1 side Yeovil Town Ladies, but was forced to withdraw from her contract after announcing she was pregnant with her second child.

The forward joined home town Watford F.C. Women, ahead of the 2017–18 season, before signing a contract extension ahead of the 2018–19 campaign with the club.

In February 2021, Ward joined London Bees on a short-term dual registration basis, whilst her parent club waited for their season to resume due to the COVID-19 pandemic.

International career
In July 2007, Ward made a 10-minute substitute appearance for the England women's national under-23 football team in a 4–1 Nordic Cup defeat by Finland.

Ward represented England at Under-23 level, but, due to her Welsh maternal grandfather, she made her senior debut for Wales against Luxembourg on 30 September 2008. Wales came from behind to win 6–1, with Ward scoring the second goal.

In August 2010, Ward scored six goals in Wales' 15–0 win over Azerbaijan. She was listed as a Chelsea player. By the time of Ward's 50th cap, against Belarus in September 2013, she had scored 30 international goals. As of October 2021, Ward is the all-time top scorer for Wales with 44 goals in 99 appearances.

On 8 April 2022, Ward played her 100th match for Wales in a 2–1 defeat to France in the 2023 FIFA Women's World Cup qualification.

On 3 March 2023, Ward announced her international retirement.

International goals
Scores and results list Wales's goal tally first.

References

External links
 Profile at the Football Association of Wales (FAW)
 Profile at Chelsea Ladies

1986 births
Living people
Welsh women's footballers
Wales women's international footballers
Watford F.C. Women players
Arsenal W.F.C. players
Chelsea F.C. Women players
FA Women's National League players
Footballers from the London Borough of Brent
Women's Super League players
England women's under-23 international footballers
Barnet F.C. Ladies players
Reading F.C. Women players
Yeovil Town L.F.C. players
English women's footballers
Women's association football forwards
Women's Championship (England) players
FIFA Century Club